Mathieu Riboulet (13 June 1960 – 5 February 2018) was a French writer and film director.

Biography 
The son of architect , Mathieu Riboulet studied cinema and modern letters at the New Sorbonne University.

He made several self-produced films within the framework of the Spy Films company established in the 1980s before devoting himself to writing. The main characters of Quelqu'un s'approche, of the novels Le Corps des anges and L'Amant des morts are young men attracted by men.

In November 2012, his novel  was awarded the prix Décembre.

In 2013, Riboulet became a Chevalier of the Ordre des Arts et des Lettres.

He died from cancer on 5 February 2018.

Filmography 
 2007: Guillaume et les sortilèges by Pierre Léon : La Perfection faite Homme.

Works 
1996: Un sentiment océanique, Maurice Nadeau
1999: Mère Biscuit, Maurice Nadeau
2000: Quelqu'un s'approche, Maurice Nadeau
2003: Le Regard de la source, Maurice Nadeau
2004: Les Âmes inachevées, Éditions Gallimard, series "Haute enfance"
2005: Le Corps des anges, Gallimard
2006: Deux larmes dans un peu d'eau, Gallimard, series "L'un et l'autre"
2008: L'Amant des morts, Verdier
2010: Avec Bastien, 
2012: Les Œuvres de miséricorde, Verdier - Prix Décembre
2014: (with Véronique Aubouy) À la lecture, Grasset
2015: (with Patrick Boucheron) Prendre dates. Paris, 6 janvier - 14 janvier 2015, Verdier
2015: Lisières du corps, Verdier
2015: Entre les deux il n’y a rien, Verdier
2016: Or, il parlait du sanctuaire de son corps, Les Inaperçus

Honours and prizes 
Mathieu Riboulet was awarded several prizes:
 Prix Thyde Monnier de la SGDL 2008 for L’Amant des morts
 Prix de l’Estuaire 2009 for L’Amant des morts
 Prix Décembre 2012 for Les Œuvres de miséricorde

References

External links 
 Biographie, bibliographie et photo on the site of the éditions Verdier
 Interview with Mathieu Riboulet à propos des parutions de 2015
 Mathieu Riboulet on France Culture
 Mathieu Riboulet, Entre les deux, il n'y a rien on France Culture
 Entre les deux il n'y a rien de Mathieu Riboulet : récit de deuils impossible on FranceInfo

20th-century French non-fiction writers
21st-century French non-fiction writers
French film directors
French LGBT novelists
Prix Décembre winners
Chevaliers of the Ordre des Arts et des Lettres
1960 births
2018 deaths